Dimitrios Mikhail (born 1933) is a Greek boxer. He competed in the men's light welterweight event at the 1960 Summer Olympics. At the 1960 Summer Olympics, he lost to Bernie Meli of Ireland.

References

1933 births
Living people
Greek male boxers
Olympic boxers of Greece
Boxers at the 1960 Summer Olympics
Sportspeople from Athens
Mediterranean Games medalists in boxing
Light-welterweight boxers
Mediterranean Games bronze medalists for Greece
Competitors at the 1959 Mediterranean Games
20th-century Greek people